Christopher Bibaku (born 13 December 1995) is a French professional footballer who plays as a forward for German club VFC Plauen.

Career
Before the second half of the 2017–18 season, Bibaku signed for Czech fourth division side Lokomotiva Petrovice.

Before the second half of the 2018–19 season, he signed for Hertha Wels in the Austrian third division after training with Austrian fifth division and fourth division clubs.

In 2019, Bibaku signed for Vorwärts Steyr in the Austrian 2. Liga, where he made 26 appearances and scored three goals across all competitions. On 19 July 2019, he scored on his debut for Vorwärts Steyr during a 3–2 win over Bad Gleichenberg in the Austrian Cup.

In 2020, he signed for Finnish team AC Kajaani.

Before the second half of the 2020–21 season, Bibaku signed for Mosta in the Maltese top flight. After that, he was sent on loan to Maltese second division outfit Naxxar Lions.

Bibaku moved to Oberliga Rheinland-Pfalz/Saar club Eintracht Trier in July 2021.

Career statistics

References

External links
 
 

1995 births
Living people
French footballers
Association football forwards
SK Vorwärts Steyr players
AC Kajaani players
Naxxar Lions F.C. players
SV Eintracht Trier 05 players
VFC Plauen players
2. Liga (Austria) players
Austrian Regionalliga players
Ykkönen players
Maltese Challenge League players
Oberliga (football) players
French expatriate footballers
French expatriate sportspeople in the Czech Republic
Expatriate footballers in the Czech Republic
French expatriate sportspeople in Austria
Expatriate footballers in Austria
French expatriate sportspeople in Finland
Expatriate footballers in Finland
French expatriate sportspeople in Malta
Expatriate footballers in Malta
French expatriate sportspeople in Germany
Expatriate footballers in Germany